Hermetia comstocki, the agave fly, is a species of soldier fly in the family Stratiomyidae.

Distribution
Mexico, United States.

References

Stratiomyidae
Insects described in 1885
Taxa named by Samuel Wendell Williston
Diptera of North America